Tull may refer to:

Places
 Tull, Arkansas, a town in the United States
 Tull en 't Waal, a village in the Netherlands

Other uses
Tull (surname)
Jethro Tull (band), British progressive rock group
Tull, a fictional town in the Stephen King novel The Dark Tower: The Gunslinger

See also
 Tully (disambiguation)